The Phillip Island SuperSprint was an annual motor racing event for Supercars, held at the Phillip Island Grand Prix Circuit in Phillip Island, Victoria. The event was a semi-regular part of the Supercars Championship, and its previous incarnations, the Australian Touring Car Championship, Shell Championship Series and V8 Supercars Championship, between 1990 and 2019.

The circuit has also previously hosted championship rounds as the Phillip Island 500, in 1976 and 1977, from 2008 to 2011 and from 2017 to 2018.

Format
The event was staged over a three-day weekend, from Friday to Sunday. Four thirty-minute practice sessions were held, two on Friday and   one each on Saturday and Sunday. Saturday featured a three-stage knockout qualifying session which decided the grid positions for the following 120 kilometre sprint race. Sunday featured a repeat of the Saturday qualifying format with a longer 200 km race distance following.

History
While the Phillip Island 500 was a part of the Australian Touring Car Championship (ATCC) in 1976 and 1977, the circuit closed soon after and did not re-open until 1988. In 1990, the circuit hosted a sprint round of the championship for the first time, won by Dick Johnson, his final round win in the ATCC. After an absence from the calendar in 1991 and 1992 as the circuit alternated with Melbourne circuit Sandown Raceway, Phillip Island returned to the ATCC in 1993 and Glenn Seton went on to dominate the event, winning five of the six races held across 1993, 1994 and 1995. In 1994, rain started to fall during the formation lap for the first race and Seton was amongst many drivers to start the race from pitlane to change to wet tyres. As the rain increased, Seton quickly charged through the field and held off Mark Skaife to win.

Despite the early success of Johnson and Seton for Ford, Holden went on to win all seven events from 1996 to 2002. The high speed nature of the circuit has also contributed to several major crashes at the event in its history. In 1996, John Bowe and Craig Lowndes left the circuit at high speed in damp conditions, Bowe hitting an earth embankment and rolling several times. Craig Baird won the only race of his career at the 2000 event. In a near repeat of a crash involving Mark Larkham in 1997, Jason Bargwanna suffered a major crash during the 2002 event when Greg Murphy squeezed him off the track at the start of the race. The contact with the wall sent Bargwanna's car into the tyre wall and a series of rolls before it came to rest in the middle of the track. Later in the event, Max Wilson's car suffered heavy damage when he was hit by Craig Lowndes after Wilson had been spun by Marcos Ambrose. Meanwhile, Paul Romano was given a 150-point penalty for deliberately colliding with Rodney Forbes. The penalty saw Romano finish the season with negative points. Lowndes went on to win the next year at Phillip Island, the first round win for Ford Performance Racing, in a rain-shortened race.

Phillip Island did not feature on the Supercars calendar in 2004 and then from 2005 to 2007 the circuit hosted the Grand Finale, the last round of each season. In 2005, Russell Ingall secured his first championship win at the event, having finished runner-up in the championship four times previously. Going into the 2006 event, Rick Kelly led the championship by a small points margin over Lowndes. Following the first two races, in which Lowndes complained of being unfairly held up by Kelly's teammates, Kelly and Lowndes were tied on points. A controversial incident in the third race saw Kelly make contact with the back of Lowndes, sending Lowndes and Kelly's brother Todd into a spin. Lowndes was stranded in the middle of the track and was hit by Will Davison, sustaining steering damage which caused him to finish in thirty-first place. Despite receiving a drive-through penalty for his role in the incident and finishing eighteenth and a protest from Lowndes' team, Kelly was crowned champion. The event decided the championship again in 2007, with Garth Tander and Jamie Whincup battling for the title. Tander won the event, winning two races, and secured the championship by two points over Whincup.

From 2008 to 2011, the sprint round dropped off to the calendar due to the revival of the Phillip Island 500 two-driver endurance race. The one exception to this was 2009, in which Phillip Island hosted both a sprint event as well as the endurance event, due to the late cancellation of that year's Desert 400 in Bahrain. The Sandown 500 returned to the calendar in 2012, in place of the Phillip Island 500, and Phillip Island reverted to hosting a sprint round of the championship. The 2013 event saw Alexandre Prémat's car leave the track at high speed and hit the driver's door of James Courtney's car. Courtney fractured his tibia in the incident and was forced to miss the next, and final, round of the season at the Sydney 500. In 2014, Jamie Whincup secured a record sixth Australian Touring Car title by winning the second race of the weekend. At the same event, Scott McLaughlin won the first championship event for Volvo since 1986. 

The 2016 event, again won by McLaughlin, was the 500th event in Australian Touring Car Championship history. In 2017, the Phillip Island round was extended to 500 km, across two races, and the Phillip Island 500 name was revived. After two years of the Phillip Island 500, the SuperSprint format returned to the event in 2019. For the first time since 2004, Phillip Island was not included in the 2020 Supercars Championship calendar in any capacity. The event was then a late inclusion in the 2021 Supercars Championship, with the event to be run on the date of the cancelled Australian motorcycle Grand Prix, before being cancelled due to the COVID-19 pandemic.

Winners

Notes
  – From 2008 to 2011 and from 2017 to 2018, the Phillip Island Grand Prix Circuit hosted the Phillip Island 500.
  – In 2009, the Phillip Island Grand Prix Circuit also hosted a second round of the championship, the 2009 Phillip Island 500.

Multiple winners

By driver

By team

By manufacturer

 Notes
  – DJR Team Penske was known as Dick Johnson Racing from 1980 to 2014, hence their statistics are combined.

Event names and sponsors
 1990, 1993–2003: Phillip Island
 2005: BigPond Grand Finale
 2006: Caterpillar Grand Finale
 2007: Dunlop Grand Finale
 2009: The Island 300
 2012: Phillip Island 300
 2013: Sargent Security Phillip Island 360
 2014: Plus Fitness Phillip Island 400
 2015–16, 2019: WD-40 Phillip Island SuperSprint

See also
 Phillip Island 500 
 Grand Finale
 List of Australian Touring Car Championship races

References

Supercars Championship races
Sports competitions in Victoria (Australia)